Ronnie Rancifer (born 1952) is an American keyboardist, musician and songwriter, noted for being a keyboardist for The Jackson 5 from their early Gary, Indiana days until the end of their famed career at Motown. The label presented Rancifer and drummer Johnny Jackson as the cousins of Jackie, Tito, Jermaine, Marlon, Michael, however neither Rancifer nor Johnny Jackson are actually related to the Jacksons.

In addition to playing keys for the Jackson 5, Rancifer worked as a songwriter on some of their albums.  Rancifer had a long career as a songwriter in Los Angeles, and although the note below infers that he may not have been a member of the group through 1975, it has been confirmed that he was with the group until 1975.

 NOTE:  References differ on Rancifer's tenure with the Jackson 5. Some indicate he was only a member of the group for 1962 to 1963, while other references state his was a member from 1964 to 1975.

He co-wrote "I Am Love" from the 1974 album Dancing Machine.

Ronnie Rancifer was a member of the Jackson 5/Jacksons until 1975. During the 1980s he worked with other Motown artists, and toured with Smokey Robinson.

References

External links

 The Jacksons Biography
 The Jackson 5

Living people
African-American pianists
American organists
American male organists
American rhythm and blues keyboardists
American soul keyboardists
American funk keyboardists
Songwriters from California
Musicians from Gary, Indiana
Musicians from Los Angeles
Writers from Gary, Indiana
American male pianists
21st-century American pianists
21st-century organists
21st-century American male musicians
21st-century American keyboardists
20th-century American keyboardists
20th-century American male musicians
African-American songwriters
20th-century African-American musicians
21st-century African-American musicians
American male songwriters
1952 births